Maurice Emygdius Watts (11 June 1878 – 22 February 1933) was an Indian lawyer, civil servant and administrator who served as the Diwan of Travancore from 1925 to 1929.

Early life and education 

Watts was born on 11 June 1878 to Frank Watts, Chief Secretary of the Government of Travancore. He had his early education in Madras and after graduating in law, entered the Madras provincial service in 1901.

Death 

Watts died on 22 February 1933 in London at the age of 54.  The Watts lane in the Nanthancode suburb of Trivandrum city was named in the memory of the Watts family.

Family 

Watt's sister Dorothia Henriett Watts was a teacher who served as governess and tutor to the princesses of the royal family of Travancore. After India's independence in 1947, she settled down in Kotagiri in Nilgiris District where she spent the last days of her life.

Notes 

1878 births
1933 deaths
Diwans of Travancore